The 1908 Oklahoma Sooners football team represented the University of Oklahoma as an independent during the 1908 college football season. In their fourth year under head coach Bennie Owen, the Sooners compiled an 8–1–1 record, and outscored their opponents by a combined total of 272 to 35.

Schedule

Roster

References

Oklahoma
Oklahoma Sooners football seasons
Oklahoma Sooners football